The Ghana Bar Association (GBA) is a professional association of lawyers in Ghana, including what used to be called solicitors and barristers but are now called legal practitioners, as well as magistrates.
By convention all lawyers admitted to practice in Ghana become automatic members of the association. The GBA has its roots in the Gold Coast Bar Association, the first president of which was Sierra Leonean lawyer Francis (Frans) Dove.

History and membership

The British parliament established the Supreme Court of Judicature for the Gold Coast Colony in 1876, with a Chief Justice and no more than four Puisne Justices.
John Mensah Sarbah was the first native of Ghana to be called to the bar by Lincoln's Inn in 1887.
The legal system was based on that of England, in which solicitors provide legal advice and prepare legal documents, while barristers act as advocates in court. However, this division was not observed in practice in Ghana, and in 1960 an act abolished the distinction.
Until the Ghana School of Law was established in 1958, all lawyers were trained abroad, almost always at the Inns of Court in England. 
As of 2011, there were about 2,500 practising lawyers, although not all had registered as members of the Bar Association.

Even though the legal profession in The Gold Coast (now Ghana) can be traced to as far back as 1846, the Ghana Bar Association as a body had its first constitution in 1958.

The current national president of the GBA is Yaw Boafo

Some past presidents of the GBA include:

Robert Samuel Blay (1957–1959) and (1960–1962)
Archie Casely-Hayford (1959–1960)
J. B. Danquah (1962–1963)
Victor Owusu (acting 1963–1965) and (1965–1966)
William Ofori-Atta (1966–1967)
Joe Appiah (1967–1970)
Joe Reindorf (1970–1971)
Edward Nathaniel Moore (1971–1972)
J. B. Quashie-Idun (1972–1976)
J. K. F. Adadevoh (1976–1979)
W. A. N. Adumoah-Bossman (1979–1981)
E. D. Kom (1981–1982)
J. K. Agyemang (1982–1985)
Peter Ala Adjetey (1985–1989)
Anthony K. Mmieh (1989–1992?)
Nutifafa Kuenyehia (1992–95), 
Sam Okudzeto(1995–98)
Joseph Ebow Quashie (1998–2001) 
Paul Adu-Gyamfi (2001–?)
Solomon Kwame Tetteh
Nii Osah Mills (2007–08)
Frank Beecham (2009–12)
Nene A. O. Amegatcher (2012–2015)
Benson Nutsukpui 2015–2018
Tony Forson Jnr. 2018–2021

The Ghana Bar Association is a member of the International Bar Association.

Controversy

In October 2010, then GBA Vice President, Mr. Justice Kusi-Minkah Premo, called on the Chief Justice and the Council to eliminate inconsistency, corruption and misconduct by judges.
In April 2011, then National President Frank W. K. Beecham spoke in defence of Mr Justice E. K. Ayebi, a judge who had come under attack after acquitting 14 defendants in a murder trial.

In July 2011, four lawyers made allegations of widespread corruption among judges. The GBA condemned the four for making unsubstantiated claims, and asked them to name the judges. Another lawyer openly confessed to having bribed a judge.
The GBA said it would take legal steps to prosecute him.
The four lawyers were blacklisted by the Association of Magistrates and Judges.
They and others stated that they were considering forming an alternative Association.
The Ghana Bar Association held its annual general meeting in Cape Coast in September 2011, soon after two magistrates had been sacked for demanding bribes. Then GBA President Frank Beecham said that the association would fight corruption in all its forms. The GBA would establish a complaints unit to take complaints about corruption and ensure that offenders were prosecuted.

See also
General Legal Council

References

External links
 Official website

1876 establishments in Gold Coast (British colony)
African bar associations
Legal organisations based in Ghana
Organizations established in 1876